A super-app (also written as super app or superapp) is a mobile or web application that can provide multiple services including payment and financial transaction processing, effectively becoming an all-encompassing self-contained commerce and communication online platform that embraces many aspects of personal and commercial life. Notable examples of super-apps include Alipay, Tencent's WeChat in China, and Grab in Southeast Asia.

For end users, a superapp is an application provides a set of core features and with the addition of access to independently developed miniapps. For app developers, a superapp is an application integrated with the capabilities of platforms and ecosystems that allows third-parties to develop and publish miniapps. Following Elon Musk's acquisition of Twitter in October 2022, Elon Musk expressed his ambition to create an 'everything app'. which would become a widely used super-app.

History 
The super-app term was first used to describe WeChat, a ubiquitous application used by 1.2 billion people, mostly from China. Recognition of WeChat as a super-app stems from its combination of messaging, payments, e-commerce, and much more within a single application, making it indispensable for many users. WeChat's establishment of the super-app model have led companies like Meta (formerly Facebook) to try and build similar applications outside of China.

In India, Tata Group has announced that it is currently developing a super app named Tata Neu. Major Indian companies like Paytm, PhonePe, and ITC Maars also have apps in development that might constitute super-apps.

In Southeast Asia, Grab and Gojek lay claim to the super-app classification despite lacking many of the features offered by WeChat. Accordingly, growth-stage companies like Shopee, Traveloka, and AirAsia have also expanded the range of services offered by their respective applications.

In 2022 Elon Musk expressed interest in creating a super-app under the name "X".

Notable examples

Alipay 
Alipay is a third-party mobile and online payment platform established in Hangzhou, China in February 2004 by Alibaba Group and its founder Jack Ma. It operates in association with Ant Group, an affiliate company of the Chinese Alibaba Group.

Gojek 
Gojek is an Indonesian on-demand multi-service digital platform and fintech payment super-app. Established in Jakarta in 2010, as a call center to connect consumers to courier delivery and two-wheeled ride-hailing services, it launched its mobile app in 2015 with four services: GoRide, GoSend, GoShop, and GoFood, which has since expanded to offer over 20 services. In 2021, it merged with another Indonesian unicorn, Tokopedia, forming decacorn GoTo Gojek Tokopedia.

Grab 
Grab is a Southeast Asian technology company headquartered in Singapore and Indonesia. Founded in 2012 as the MyTeksi app in Kuala Lumpur, Malaysia, it expanded the following year as GrabTaxi, before moving its headquarters to Singapore in 2014 and rebranded officially as Grab. In addition to ride-hailing and transportation services, the company's mobile app also offers food delivery and digital payments services.

WeChat 
WeChat is a Chinese multi-purpose instant messaging, social media and mobile payment app. First released in 2011, it became the world's largest standalone mobile app in 2018, with over 1 billion monthly active users. WeChat provides text messaging, hold-to-talk voice messaging, broadcast (one-to-many) messaging, video conferencing, video games, sharing of photographs and videos and location sharing.

Amap 
Amap is a leading provider of mobile digital map, navigation and real-time traffic information in China. It empowers major mobile apps across different industry verticals, including local services, ride-hailing and social networking.

Taobao 
Launched in 2003, Taobao provides consumers from both large cities and less developed areas with an engaging, personalized shopping experience, optimized by data analytics and technology. Aside from being a treasure trove of products, this one-stop super app allows users to do everything from ordering food, booking flights, book an express delivery, reserve show tickets, to watching livestreams and even trying out new items virtually.

Criticism 
Although apps that fit the super-app classification can offer users a wider variety of services in comparison to single-purpose alternatives, internet regulators in regions such as the US and Europe have become more concerned about the overall power of the technology industry and have become more critical of companies developing such apps. In China, WeChat and other local firms have been ordered to open up their platforms to rivals by local regulators.

There are also reports that suggest it might be difficult to replicate WeChat's super-app model. This stems partly from the peaking of smartphone penetration rates in many regions worldwide, which have led to overcrowded app stores and tighter restrictions on targeted advertising as regulators assert more control over the companies. From a technical viewpoint, single-purpose apps are comparatively faster, more responsive and easier to navigate than super-apps, which help improve the overall user experience. Super-apps are also likelier to store larger amounts of personal data to facilitate the delivery of their services, and users run a greater risk of becoming victims of severe data breaches. In 2020, this unfolded with Tokopedia, when data of 91 million users was stolen and shared by hackers.

It has also been noted that a user that loses access to their account or is banned from a super-app generally loses access to multiple real-life services and digital applications.

See also 
Closed platform
Alibaba Superapp solution

References 

E-commerce
2020s neologisms